Anastasiya Alistratava (born 16 October 2003) is a Belarusian artistic gymnast.  She is the 2019 European Games uneven bars bronze medalist.

Early life 
Alistratava was born in Grodno in 2003.  Her parents started her in gymnastics when she was four years old.

Gymnastics career

Junior

2016–17
In 2016 Alistratava made her debut at the Antonina Koshel Cup where she placed fourth amongst the junior competitors; she recorded the second highest balance beam score.  In 2017 she competed at the European Youth Olympic Festival alongside Dziyana Kirykovich and Aliaksandra Varabyova.  As a team they finished in 17th place.  Individually Alistratava finished the all-around in 30th place and did not qualify for the final.

2018
In 2018 Alistratava competed at the Dityatin Cup where she finished second in the all-around behind Nelli Audi of Russia.  During event finals she won gold on uneven bars, silver on balance beam behind Audi, and bronze on floor exercise behind Audi and Darya Yassinskaya of Kazakhstan.  She next competed at the Youth Olympic Qualifier where she placed twenty-fourth in the all-around; however Aliaksandra Varabyova would go on to represent Belarus at the 2018 Youth Olympics.  Alistratava was later selected to represent Belarus at the 2018 European Championships alongside Varabyova, Ganna Metelitsa, Kseniya Pilets, and Anastasiya Savitskaya.  Together they finished twelfth as a team.  Individually Alistratava finished fifteenth in the all-around and qualified to the uneven bars final where she finished seventh.  Alistratava finished the season competing at the Belarusian National Championships where she finished second behind Varabyova in the all-around, first on uneven bars, second on balance beam behind Savitskaya, and fourth on floor exercise.

Senior

2019
Alistratava turned senior in 2019.  She competed at the European Championships where she placed fourth on uneven bars behind Russians Anastasia Ilyankova and Angelina Melnikova and Alice D'Amato of Italy.  She next competed at the European Games Test Event where she placed fifth in the all-around, first on uneven bars, and second on floor exercise behind Yelizaveta Hubareva of the Ukraine.  At the European Games she qualified to the all-around, uneven bars, and floor exercise finals and was the third reserve for the balance beam final.  During the all-around final she placed twelfth.  She won bronze on the uneven bars behind Melnikova and Becky Downie of Great Britain. On floor exercise she finished fourth.  Alistratava next competed at the Paris Challenge Cup where she placed fourth on uneven bars and sixth on floor exercise.  Alistratava ended the season competing at the World Championships in Stuttgart.  During qualifications she finished 57th in the all-around and 25th on uneven bars.  Although she did not qualify for any event finals, she qualified as an individual to the 2020 Olympic Games in Tokyo.

2021
The 2020 Summer Olympics were postponed to 2021 due to the global COVID-19 pandemic.  Alistratava was injured weeks before the start of the Olympic Games and had to withdraw from the competition.

Competitive history

References

External links
 

2003 births
Living people
Belarusian female artistic gymnasts
European Games bronze medalists for Belarus
European Games medalists in gymnastics
Gymnasts at the 2019 European Games
Sportspeople from Grodno